Bidia may refer to:

 Bidia people, an ethnic group of Australia
 Bidia language, a language of Australia
 Elias Bidía, Brazilian footballer
 Bidia Dandaron, Soviet Buddhist scholar
 Bidia (food), an African swallow food

See also 
 Bidiya
 Bidya